Imielin  is a town in Silesia in southern Poland, near Katowice. Borders on the Upper Silesian Metropolitan Union – metropolis with the population of 2 million. It is located in the Silesian Highlands. The population of the town is 9098 (2021).

Geography
The municipality is situated a short distance to the south-west of Junction 41 on the A4 Highway.

It has been in the Silesian Voivodeship since its formation in 1999, previously having been in the Katowice Voivodeship, and before that, in the Autonomous Silesian Voivodeship. Imielin is one of the towns included in the 2.7 million conurbation – Katowice urban area and within a greater Silesian metropolitan area populated by about 5,294,000 people.

Economy
The area is both industrial and agricultural. There are dolomite deposits and, beneath the flatter area to the south-west of the municipality, coal deposits.

History

Late Medieval
The earliest mention in the records of Imielin dates from 1386. At that time it was part of the Duchy of Racibórz (Ratibor), the eastern border of which was marked by the Przemsza River. Imielin, like the neighbouring villages of Kosztowy and Chełm Śląski was nevertheless isolated from the rest of the duchy by the dense forest which were a feature of the area formed by the sources and headwaters of the Kłodnica and Mleczna rivers. For this reason in 1391 the Duke of Opava-Ratibor gifted this eastern portion of his lands to the Bishop of Kraków. From then until 1742 these villages were no longer part of the political entity of Silesia, control over them instead being exercised by the bishops of Kraków.

Early Modern and Nineteenth century
Following the annexation of Silesia to Prussia by Frederick the Great, sovereignty over the villages was removed from the bishops of Kraków in 1772, and in 1796 administrative control and ownership of the land was also transferred to the Prussian crown. In 1802 Alt Gatsch (Stara Gać) was established as a daughter settlement, followed in 1820 by Neu Gatsch (Nova/New Gać).

During the period of pan-European warfare with which the nineteenth century opened, the Napoleonic general Jean Lannes, who had been appointed Prince of Severia by the Duchy of Warsaw, asserted control over Imielin, along with Severia, citing in support the fact that historically both had belonged to the Bishopric of Kraków. Following the end of the Napoleonic War, Imielin was in 1817 returned to Prussia, and in 1818 it was incorporated into the newly created Pleß administrative district.

Twentieth century
Imielin's excellent transport links to the industrial cities of Katowice, Oświęcim and Tychy enabled it to grow considerably during the twentieth century, both as a residential town for commuters to these larger centres and on account of businesses establishing themselves in Imielin itself. The official population count increased from 2,614 in 1900 to 5,200 in 1931, and to 7,757 in 1970.

Massacre during Second World War
During the German Invasion of Poland in 1939, German soldiers mass murdered 28 Poles on the night of 4 and 5 September. The victims included refugees, three women and one 5-year-old child.

Sights
A noteworthy building is Our Lady of Mount Carmel Church, a gothic revival building constructed between 1909 and 1912, and subsequently enlarged in 1953: in 1957 the height of the tower was increased to 27 meters. There is also a small chapel where Napoleon prayed on his way to Russia during his invasion of Russia.

Notable people from Imielin
 Albin Siekierski (19201989), author

References

External links
Jewish Community in Imielin on Virtual Shtetl

Cities and towns in Silesian Voivodeship
Bieruń-Lędziny County
Province of Upper Silesia
Silesian Voivodeship (1920–1939)
Massacres in Poland
World War II sites in Poland
World War II sites of Nazi Germany
Germany–Poland relations
Nazi war crimes in Poland